Burmah Road is a major thoroughfare in the city of George Town in Penang, Malaysia. It is one of the main roads leading out of the city centre to the suburbs, stretching from the heart of George Town towards Pulau Tikus.

Burmah Road is one of the few places worldwide that was named after the nation state of Burma (now Myanmar). As its name implies, the road was once home to a significant Burmese community. In addition, ethnic Eurasians and Thais still live at or around the vicinity of the road within Pulau Tikus, contributing to the street's multicultural character.

The road is also well known as one of the destinations within Penang Island to sample the famed local cuisine. The most popular hawker centres at Burmah Road are the New World Park and Pulau Tikus Wet Market, the latter of which is located just off the road in Pulau Tikus.

Etymology 

Burmah Road was named after the Burmese community that used to reside at the road. Upon arriving on Penang Island in the late 18th century, the Burmese established their own settlement, named Kampung Ava, which was located near the road. The Dhammikarama Burmese Temple, which was built within that settlement, still stands to this day as a reminder of the Burmese presence in George Town.

In the olden days, water sourced from the interior of Penang Island had to be carried on ox-carts and pails suspended on shoulder yokes. Burmah Road was the route taken by these water-sellers to reach George Town, hence the road's nickname, 'Jalan Kreta Ayer', which meant 'Water Cart Road' in Malay.

History 

Burmah Road was originally laid out as a rural road that ran from the settlement of George Town to the villages in Pulau Tikus, cutting through plantations and vegetation that existed outside the settlement at the time.

The eastern city end of Burmah Road, where a pedestrian bridge near Komtar now stands, was actually the site of a bridge that traversed a canal in the area. Prangin Canal, which also lent its name to the adjoining Prangin Road, once stretched all the way up to Transfer Road further west. Thus, a wooden drawbridge, known as Titi Papan, was used to cross the canal; the name is immortalised today by a mosque, Masjid Titi Papan.

Over the centuries, various ethnic communities have resided along Burmah Road, giving it its multicultural character. The western end of the road, which forms an intersection with Cantonment Road, marks the heart of Pulau Tikus and is home to a substantial Eurasian community. The Church of the Immaculate Conception at this particular section of Burmah Road was founded in 1811 by the Eurasians. The Burmese and Thais reside immediately east of the Eurasians. Meanwhile, closer to the city centre, Chinese associations and temples line the street.

Since the latter half of the 20th century, modern urbanisation has also gentrified much of Burmah Road, as the growth of George Town continued westwards and subsumed Pulau Tikus into an affluent suburb of the city.

Landmarks 

 Church of the Immaculate Conception
 Queen Victoria Memorial
 Chinese Recreation Club
 New World Park

Education 
 Convent Pulau Tikus
 PTPL College

Health care 
 Penang Adventist Hospital

Hotels 
 Tune Hotel
 Georgetown City Hotel

Consulates

See also 
 List of roads in George Town

References 

Roads in Penang
George Town, Penang